Euphaedra simplex, the simple orange forester, is a butterfly in the family Nymphalidae. It is found in eastern Nigeria, Cameroon, the Republic of the Congo, the Central African Republic, the Democratic Republic of the Congo and north-western Zambia. The habitat consists of primary forests.

References

Butterflies described in 1978
simplex